Statistics Poland (formerly known in English as the Central Statistical Office (popularly called GUS)) is Poland's chief government executive agency charged with collecting and publishing statistics related to the country's economy, population, and society, at the national and local levels. The president of Statistics Poland (currently Dominik Rozkrut) reports directly to the Prime Minister of Poland and is considered the equivalent of a Polish government minister.

The agency was established on 13 July 1918 by Ludwik Krzywicki, one of the most notable sociologists of his time.

Inactive during World War II, GUS was reorganized in March 1945 and as of 31 July 1947 was under control of the Ordinance of the Council of Ministers (along with the Organization of Official Statistics).

The office is divided into several separate branches, each responsible for a different set of data. The branches include the Divisions of Coordination of Statistical Surveys, Analyses and Regional Statistics, Dissemination, National Accounts and Finance, Business Statistics and Registers, Social Statistics, Services Statistics, Agriculture and Environment Statistics, International Cooperation, Budgetary, and Personnel.

Notable GUS publications include Rocznik Statystyczny (Statistical Yearbook), Mały Rocznik Statystyczny (Concise Statistical Yearbook), Demographic Yearbook of Poland, and Wiadomości Statystyczne (Statistical News).

In November 2018 GUS estimated that the average monthly wage in Poland was PLN 4,966 (€1,158, $1,317). According to GUS, during the same month Poland's retail sales increased by 8.2% year-on-year and fell by 2.7% month-on-month while the economy as a whole grew at an annual rate of 5.1%. In December 2018, prices of consumer goods and services increased by 1.1% from the previous year while wages rose 1% from the previous month and unemployment rose .1%.

Former presidents

1918–1929 Józef Buzek
1929–1939 Edward Szturm de Sztrem
1939–1945 vacant
1945–1949 Stefan Szulc
1949–1965 Zygmunt Pudowicz
1965–1972 Wincenty Kawalec
1972–1980 Stanisław Kuziński
1980–1989 Wiesław Sadowski
1989–1991 Franciszek Kubiczek
1991–1992 Bohdan Wyżnikiewicz
1992–1995 Józef Oleński
1995–2006 Tadeusz Toczyński
2006–2006 Janusz Witkowski (acting)
2006–2011 Józef Oleński
2011-2016 Janusz Witkowski
since 2016 Dominik Rozkrut

See also
 Census in Poland

References

External links
 

1918 establishments in Poland
Poland
Demographics of Poland
Government agencies of Poland
Organizations established in 1918